Malnar can be used to define multiple things:

 Željko Malnar, the Croatian author and TV personality
 MalNar is used as an abbreviation for Canadian progressive rock band Rush's song, "Malignant Narcissism (song)."
 The latter is in turn referring to the personality disorder Malignant Narcissism.